Shoufeng Township is a rural Township in Hualien County, Taiwan. The township sits in the north segment of East Rift Valley between Taiwan's Central Range and Coastal Mountain Range near the Pacific Ocean. The Township is best known as home to National Dong Hwa University (NDHU), a national research university and famous tourist attraction in East Taiwan.

Geography

A large part of the township is located centered on the Huadong Valley north of where the Shoufeng River empties into the Hualien River.  The township extends eastward over the Hai'an Range to the Pacific Ocean in the east.

Administrative divisions

The township comprises 15 villages: Chinan, Fengli, Fengping, Fengshan, Gonghe, Guangrong, Mizhan, Pinghe, Shoufeng, Shuhu, Shuilian, Xikou, Yanliao, Yuemei and Zhixue.

Demographics
It has 17,119 inhabitants in 7,370 households.

Education

Higher education

The National Dong Hwa University dominates the township of Shoufeng, providing the township with its distinctive college-town character. University buildings are located in the north of the township and the campus is directly adjacent to the Zhixue Street, Papaya Creek Delta, and Zhixue Railway Station.

Mandarin education
National Dong Hwa University Chinese Language Center

Tourist attractions

 Taroko National Park
 
 
 Liyu Lake
 Honan Temple
 Niushan Hunting Reserved Area
 Lichuan Fishing Farm
 Farglory Ocean Park
 Chihnan National Forest
 Fengtian Immigrant Village

Transportation

Taiwan Railways Administration stations on the Taitung line in Shoufeng include:
 Zhixue Station
 Pinghe Station
 Shoufeng Station
 Fengtian Station

Highways in Shoufeng include:
Provincial Highway 9, a north-south route through the Huadong Valley
Provincial Highway 9C, (9), a north-south alternative route to PH 9
Provincial Highway 11, a north-south route along the Pacific coast
Provincial Highway 11C (11), a north-south route connecting National Dong Hwa University with PH 9 and PH 11.
, along the east bank of the Hualien River

References

External links

Hualien Shoufeng Township 
East Rift Valley National Scenic Area
East Coast National Scenic Area
Hualien Ocean Park

Townships in Hualien County